USS LST-657 was a  in the United States Navy during World War II. She was transferred to the Indonesian Navy as KRI Teluk Manado (505).

Construction and commissioning 
LST-657 was laid down on 16 December 1943 at American Bridge Company, Ambridge, Pennsylvania. Launched on 25 February 1944 and commissioned on 10 April 1943.

Service in United States Navy 
During World War II, LST-657 was assigned to the Asiatic-Pacific theater. She then participated in the occupation service in the Far East from 2 September 1945 until her decommissioning on 23 February 1946.

After being decommissioned, on the same day she was assigned to Commander Naval Forces Far East (COMNAVFE) Shipping Control Authority for Japan (SCAJAP), redesignated Q071.

Transferred to the Military Sea Transportation Service (MSTS), 31 March 1952 and placed in service as USNS T-LST-657.

Placed out of service and struck from the Naval Register, 1 May 1961.

Under provisions of the Military Assistance Program, she was transferred to the Indonesia in 1961, and served as Teluk Manado (505).

Service in Indonesian Navy 
She was finally decommissioned in 1983.

Awards 
LST-657 have earned the following awards:

China Service Medal (extended) 
American Campaign Medal
Asiatic-Pacific Campaign Medal 
World War II Victory Medal 
Navy Occupation Service Medal (with Asia clasp)

Citations

Sources
 
 
 
 
 

LST-542-class tank landing ships
Ships built in Ambridge, Pennsylvania
World War II amphibious warfare vessels of the United States
Cold War amphibious warfare vessels of the United States
LST-542-class tank landing ships of the Indonesian Navy
Amphibious warfare vessels of the Indonesian Navy
1944 ships